The Hass refugee camp bombing was an aerial bombardment of a refugee camp in the Syrian opposition-held town of Hass in the Idlib Governorate of Syria, which has been deemed a war crime by Human Rights Watch. It was perpetrated on 16 August 2019, at 7:25 p.m. local time, during the Syrian Civil War. The bombing killed 20 civilians, including a pregnant woman, and injured another 52 people.

The refugee camp was located outside the town, eight miles from the nearest front line, and there were no military targets nearby. Later analysis confirmed that the bombing was perpetrated by a bomber jet of the Russian Federation. Two Russian Sukhoi Su-24 war planes departed the Khmeimim Air Base on that day, at 7:02 p.m., and were then circling the area. No Syrian war planes were recorded over the area at the time of the bombardment. The two bombs dropped on the refugee camp were identified as OFAB-100-120 and KAB-500. The blast collapsed a row of buildings around the courtyard of the camp.

It was part of a wider Syrian military campaign against Idlib in 2019. Human Rights Watch released a statement saying that "under international law, deliberate or reckless attacks against civilians and civilian objects committed with criminal intent are war crimes".

France condemned the airstrike on the refugee camp and called for the cessation of hostilities.

The United Nations Human Rights Council recorded the crime in its report published on 2 March 2020. It stated the following:

See also
Armanaz massacre
April 2016 Idlib bombings
Atarib market massacre
Kamuna refugee camp massacre

References

Reports

2019 airstrikes
2019 murders in Syria
21st-century mass murder in Syria
Airstrikes conducted by Russia
August 2019 crimes in Asia

Explosions in 2019
Explosions in Syria
Idlib Governorate in the Syrian civil war
Mass murder in 2019
Massacres of the Syrian civil war in 2019
Military operations of the Syrian civil war in 2019
Military operations of the Syrian civil war involving Russia
Russian war crimes in Syria